Canyamars is one of the three villages that comprise the municipality of Dosrius, in the comarca of Maresme, Catalonia, Spain. It is situated in the base of the valley between the mountains of Corredor and  Montalt.

Places of interest
 Esglèsia de Sant Esteve, (Church of Saint Steven)
 Santuari del Corredor (16th-century hermitage)
 Megalithic Dolmen in Ca l'Arenes
 Pau de glaç (Ice Well), A semi subterranean ice house on the outskirts of Canyamars.

Images

External links

Towns in Spain